George Roger Clemo FRS (2 August 1889 – 2 March 1983) was a British organic chemist.

He was born in Slapton, Devon, the eldest son of farmer George  and Blanche Ellen (née Hyne) Clemo. He attended Kingsbridge Grammar School and went on to study science at the Royal Albert Memorial College Exeter, a forerunner of Exeter University, gaining a Bachelor of Science in 1910. He then commenced training to be a teacher and in 1911 was appointed deputy master at Penzance County School. In 1916, as part of the war effort, he joined the laboratory of William Henry Perkin, Jr. to work on dyestuffs. In 1922 he entered Queen's College, Oxford and gained an Oxford B.Sc. and DPhil, the latter under the supervision of William Henry Perkin, Jr. In 1925 he accepted the position of Director of Research at the British Dyestuffs Corporation in Manchester.

Soon afterwards he became Professor of Organic Chemistry at Armstrong College, later part of University of Newcastle. He retired in 1954.

He was elected a Fellow of the Royal Society in 1937. His candidacy citation read: "Distinguished as an organic chemist. Author or joint-author of about 45 scientific memoirs published in the Journal of the Chemical Society. These cover a wide range of topics, of which the more significant are new synthetic methods, especially in the quinoline group; strychnine and brucine; the lupin alkaloids; the constitution of santonin; catalytic production of polynuclear compounds; experiments on hexadeuterobenzene. Made outstanding contributions to chemistry of lupinane, encountering for the first time cis and transfused rings in isomeric octahydropyrrocolines. Noteworthy too are his synthetical studies in the decaline group, and on rearrangements in the course of selenium dehydrogenations." 

He was a fearless rugby player, and represented Cornwall twice in 1913. He married Angela Mary Gertrude Evans in 1921; they had three sons and a daughter.

References

1889 births
1983 deaths
People from South Hams (district)
Cornish rugby union players
Organic chemists
Alumni of The Queen's College, Oxford
Academics of Newcastle University
Fellows of the Royal Society
British chemists